Haruka Hirotsu (弘津悠, born 29 October 2000) is a Japanese rugby sevens player. She competed in the women's tournament at the 2020 Summer Olympics.

References

External links
 

2000 births
Living people
Female rugby sevens players
Olympic rugby sevens players of Japan
Rugby sevens players at the 2020 Summer Olympics
Place of birth missing (living people)
Japan international women's rugby sevens players
21st-century Japanese women